Lombo is a community in the Bosobolo territory of Nord-Ubangi province in the extreme northwest of the Democratic Republic of the Congo. 
It is served by the small Lombo Airport.

References

Populated places in Nord-Ubangi